This a list of mines in the Canadian province of Quebec and includes both operating and closed mines.

References

Mining in Quebec

Quebec